The Maule M-7 is a family of single-engine light aircraft that has been manufactured in the United States since the mid-1980s.

Design and development
Based on the Maule M-4, it is a high-wing, strut-braced monoplane of conventional configuration, available with tailwheel or optional tricycle wheeled undercarriage and frequently used as a floatplane with twin floats. The basic M-7 has a longer cabin than its predecessors the M5 & M6, with two seats in front, a bench seat for up to three passengers behind them, and (like the M-6) an optional third row of "kiddie seats" at the rear. Extra cabin windows can be fitted if the "kiddie seats" are to be used. The MX-7 uses the same fuselage as the M-6,which is a modified M5 fuselage but the same wing span as the M-5, and incorporates the increased fuel tankage, Hoerner-style wingtips and five-position flaps designed for the M-7.

The M-7 family has been produced both with piston and turboprop engines.

Variants

M-7 series
M-7-235 Super Rocket
Similar to M-6-235 with lengthened cabin. Tailwheel undercarriage and Lycoming O-540 engine
M-7-235B Super Rocket
Same as M7-235 including Oleo-Strut main landing gear.
M-7-235C Orion
Same as M7-235B but with sprung aluminum main landing gear and Lycoming IO-540 engine.
M-7-260
M-7-260C
M-7-420 Starcraft Turboprop
M-7-235 with Allison 250 turboprop engine
MT-7-235 Tri-Gear
Super Rocket with tricycle undercarriage
MT-7-260

MX-7 series
MX-7 Rocket
MX-7-160 Sportplane
M-6 fuselage with M-5 wings. Lycoming O-320 engine
MX-7-180 Star Rocket
MX-7 with lengthened cabin. Optional third row of seats with windows. Lycoming O-360 engine
MX-7-180A Sportplane and Comet
MX-7-180B Star Rocket
MX-7-180C Millennium
MX-7-250 Starcraft
MX-7 with Allison 250 turboprop engine
MX-7-420 Starcraft Turboprop
MX-7-235 with Allison 250 turboprop engine
MXT-7-160 Comet
MX-7-160 with tricycle undercarriage
MXT-7-180 Star Rocket
MX-7-180 with tricycle undercarriage

Specifications (M-7-235B)

Notes

References

 
 
 
 
 
 

1980s United States civil utility aircraft
M-07
High-wing aircraft
Single-engined tractor aircraft
Aircraft first flown in 1984